Jean-Baptiste Pierre de Semellé (16 June 1773 – 25 January 1839) became a French division commander during the Napoleonic Wars. He joined a volunteer regiment in 1791 and fought at Thionville in 1792. He was named commander of an infantry demi-brigade in 1800. He led his regiment at Golymin in 1806 and Eylau in 1807. He was promoted general of brigade in 1807. After being transferred to Spain, he was promoted general of division in 1811. He led his troops at Bornos in 1811. He commanded a division at Leipzig in 1813 and at Mainz in 1814. He was elected a deputy in 1822 and remained in politics until 1837. His surname is one of the names inscribed under the Arc de Triomphe, on Column 35.

References

1773 births
1839 deaths
French generals
French military personnel of the French Revolutionary Wars
French commanders of the Napoleonic Wars
Military personnel from Metz
Barons of the First French Empire
Grand Officiers of the Légion d'honneur
Names inscribed under the Arc de Triomphe